Pieter Jansen (born ) is a South African rugby union player for the New England Free Jacks of Major League Rugby (MLR).

His regular position is hooker.

References

External links
itsrugby.co.uk profile
ultimaterugby.com profile

South African rugby union players
Living people
1995 births
People from Springs, Gauteng
Rugby union hookers
Golden Lions players
Rugby union players from Gauteng
Lions (United Rugby Championship) players
New England Free Jacks players
Tel Aviv Heat players
South African expatriate sportspeople in Israel
South African expatriate rugby union players
Expatriate rugby union players in Israel